Pro Wrestling Fujiwara Group (Purofesshonaru-resuringu Fujiwara-Gumi, プロフェッショナルレスリング藤原組) was a shoot style professional wrestling promotion based in Tokyo, Japan, operating from 1991 to 1996. It was formed by Yoshiaki Fujiwara, Masakatsu Funaki and Minoru Suzuki after the collapse of the second incarnation of the UWF. The company had the financial backing of eyeglass brand Meganesuper Co., Ltd executive Hachiro Tanaka who was also funding Super World Sports (SWS). Its motto was "ONE FOR ALL AND ALL FOR ONE". 

Although the company was considered the smallest of the three UWF offshoots, it had a strong roster which included former UWF wrestlers Yusuke Fuke, Bart Vale and future MMA star Ken Shamrock. One of its most successful shows took place at the Tokyo Dome on October 4, 1992, headlined by Funaki versus Maurice Smith, which was attended by a record 40,000 fans. Legendary wrestler Karl Gotch acted as the face of the company, much like Lou Thesz did for fellow promotion UWF International.

In December 1992, Suzuki, Funaki, and Fuke left the promotion over Fujiwara's decision to send PWFG wrestlers to appear for SWS, Universal Lucha Libre and W*ING. The trio would go on to form Pancrase several months later. Fujiwara decided to close down PWFG in November 1995, however, the company was revived briefly for a few of shows during the following summer. After 1996, when everyone on the roster except Fujiwara left to form BattlARTS, the Fujiwara Gumi name was kept as the name of the booking office handling Fujiwara's appearances for other promotions. In retrospect, PWFG, along with other shoot style promotions, served as a precursor to mixed martial arts and to popular Japanese MMA promotions, particularly Pride FC.

Roster
Natives: Yoshiaki Fujiwara, Masakatsu Funaki, Minoru Suzuki, Yusuke Fuke, Kazuo Takahashi, Yuki Ishikawa, Daisuke Ikeda, Katsumi Usuda, Minoru Tanaka, Shoichi Funaki, Mamoru Okamoto, Satoshi Yoneyama (Muhammad Yone)
Foreigners: Ken Shamrock, Victor Krueger, Joe Malenko, Mark Starr, Dino Ventura, Bart Vale, Jerry Flynn, Starman, Glenn Jacobs, Dieusel Berto

See also

Professional wrestling in Japan
List of professional wrestling promotions in Japan

References

External links
Pro Wrestling Fujiwara Gumi at Cagematch.net
Pro Wrestling Fujiwara Gumi at Wrestlingdata.com

Japanese professional wrestling promotions
Entertainment companies established in 1991
Entertainment companies disestablished in 1996
1991 establishments in Japan